Rorippa gigantea is a species of plant in the cabbage family Brassicaceae. The forest bitter-cress is usually seen as an annual plant, growing to 120 cm high, found in Australian east coast forests.

References

gigantea
Flora of New South Wales
Flora of Queensland
Flora of Victoria (Australia)
Flora of Tasmania
Plants described in 1840